Muara Besar Island is an island in Mukim Serasa, Brunei-Muara District, Brunei. The island is essential for the Brunei–China relations due to its part in the Chinese Belt and Road Initiative. It can be noted that the island may be referred to Muara Island in older works. 

A proposal for an  protection status to be implemented on the island. The island is home to migratory birds, shoebirds, primary forests and forest swamps.

Location and Geography
The island is located within the Brunei Bay, in the south of the South China Sea. Administratively, it is part of Mukim Serasa of the Brunei-Muara District, Brunei. A mangrove forest is present on the inhabited island.

History
During the Battle of Brunei in World War II, United States Navy warship USS Willoughby (AGP-9) was relocated off Muara Island to which a newly established PT boat base on the island on July 10, 1945. The ship sat near the island until the Potsdam Declaration was signed on August 15, 1945. In 1988, it was recommended that 90-hectare of the southeast end of the island to be protected.

A Memorandum of Understanding (MoU) was signed in January 2008, in order to explore the construction of an export-focused industrial park. In 2011, the Ministry of Finance and Economy approved the Zhejiang Hengyi Group to establish the Hengyi Industries Sdn, and began to develop the island. The island is linked by the Pulau Muara Besar Bridge, which was completed in May 2018, and a deep sea container port.

The PMB Refinery operated by the Hengyi company within the PMB Industrial Park, was joined by two other Chinese companies (Zhejiang Hengyi Group and Damai Holdings). The industrial park took up a total land area of 955-hectare and are being used to produce petrochemical, oil and gas industries. The Phase 1 and 2 of the project were expected to be completed between late 2019 and 2023. The 2nd phase, which began construction on September 25, 2020, will be essential to Brunei's Gross Domestic Product (GDP).

Activities
There are a number of fish farms in the sheltered area between Tanjong Pelumpong and PMB.

References

Islands of Brunei